Negro Matapacos (translated as Black Cop-Killer) was a Chilean black dog that acquired fame due to his participation in the street protests that took place in Santiago, Chile, in 2011. He later became a symbol in the 2019–2020 Chilean protests as a sort of resistance to police brutality and the fight for dignity, he has many graffiti and statues made in his honor throughout the country and even in the Decolonize This Place subway protests in New York City in 2019. He was notable for his black fur and the red handkerchief that was tied around his neck, although he also had a blue and a white handkerchief that his caregiver also put on him.

His name came from Spanish matar (to kill) and paco, which is Chilean slang for "policeman".

Biography 
The dog gained fame among the university circles of Santiago, mainly in the universities of Santiago (Usach), Metropolitan of Technology (UTEM) and Central (Ucen). During the 2011 student protests Negro Matapacos became known for participating in the street marches and attacking members of Carabineros de Chile, which garnered the sympathies of the Chilean protesters.

Although Negro Matapacos was considered a stray dog, due to its presence in different university headquarters and streets of Santiago, he was under the care of María Campos, who adopted him in 2009 and who fed him, had a bed for him in her residence, tied his handkerchiefs around his neck, and blessed him before he went out. During his participation in street demonstrations, several media outlets also called him the "Chilean Loukanikos", due to his similarities with the dog that became famous during the protests in Greece between 2010 and 2012.

Negro Matapacos died on August 26, 2017, attended by veterinary personnel and caregivers. Various sources mention that at the time of his death he had left descendants of 32 puppies with 6 different dogs.

Cultural references 

In December 2013 the documentary Matapaco was released, made by Víctor Ramírez, Carolina García, Nayareth Nain, Francisco Millán and Sergio Medel of EnMarcha Films, and which won the Best Documentary award at the Santo Tomás Festival in Viña del Mar.

During the 2019 Chilean protests, the image of Negro Matapacos acquired notoriety again, and protesters drew inspiration from him during street demonstrations, appearing on various posters, stickers, murals and papier-mâché sculptures. Some people also requested that a statue of the dog be installed in a public place.

Tributes have also been made outside of Chile, such as in Japan on November 14, 2019, where the statue of Hachikō outside Shibuya station in Tokyo was adorned with a red handkerchief, similar to that worn by Negro Matapacos. On November 18, 2019, the statue of Balto at Central Park in New York City was adorned in the same way.

During the mass evasions that took place on November 1 of the same year in the New York City Subway in protest of the police's repression of a fare evader, many stickers with the image of Negro Matapacos jumping a turnstile appeared in New York City Subway stations.

See also
 List of individual dogs

References

External links 

"Matapaco" documentary
Gallery of artistic material related to Negro Matapacos

Individual dogs
Political movements in Chile
2017 animal deaths
Dogs in Chile
2019–2020 Chilean protests
Folk saints